Buckleria parvulus, the sundew plume moth, is a moth of the family Pterophoridae. The species was first described by William Barnes and Arthur Ward Lindsey in 1965 from Archbold Biological Station, Florida. It is found in the south-eastern United States, including Florida, North Carolina, Louisiana, Alabama, Georgia, Mississippi, South Carolina and Texas.

The larvae feed on Drosera brevifolia, Drosera intermedia and Drosera filiformis. They feed on the glandular trichomes, leaves and flowers of their host plant. They first ingest the sticky fluid at the tips and then clear away a patch of these hairs before feeding on the rest of the leaf. They will also eat dead insects trapped by the leaves. Pupation takes place on the inflorescence stalks or on nearby blades of grass. The pupa is light green at first, changing to yellowish tan and brown.

References

Moths described in 1921
Oxyptilini
Endemic fauna of the United States
Moths of North America